The McCurtain County Wilderness Area is a  wilderness nature preserve  north of Broken Bow, Oklahoma.  It has been owned by the Oklahoma Department of Wildlife Conservation.  It was designated a National Natural Landmark in December 1974 for its excellent example of a xeric upland oak-pine forest.

Description
It receives  of rain annually, the highest amount in the state.

Wildlife
There are over 110 bird species in the area, including the endangered red-cockaded woodpecker and bald eagle. It was nominated as an Important Bird Area in 2008 by the Audubon Society.

There are over 359 species of plants in the area.

Visiting
There is a short  nature trail, but further exploration of the east side of the reservoir requires advance permission.

References

External links
Oklahoma Department of Wildlife Conservation: McCurtain County Wilderness Area
Official Brochure and Map (PDF)

National Natural Landmarks in Oklahoma
Protected areas of McCurtain County, Oklahoma
Nature reserves in Oklahoma